Ralph Eugene Updike (May 27, 1894 – September 16, 1953) was an American lawyer, jurist, World War I and World War II veteran, and politician who served two terms as a U.S. Representative from Indiana from 1925 to 1929.

Biography 
Born in Brookville, Indiana, Updike attended the public schools of Whitcomb and Brookville, Dodds Army and Navy Academy, Washington, D.C., Columbia University, New York City, and Purdue University, Lafayette, Indiana.
During the First World War served overseas as a sergeant with the Seventy-fourth Company, Sixth Regiment, Second Division, United States Marine Corps from 1916 to 1919.
He studied law.
He was admitted to the bar in 1920.
He was graduated from the law department of Indiana University in 1923 and commenced practice in Indianapolis, Indiana.

Early political career 
He served as member of the State house of representatives 1923-1925.
He served as special judge of the city of Indianapolis in 1923 and 1924.
He served as special judge of the superior court of Marion County in 1925 and 1926.

Congress 
Updike was elected as a Republican to the Sixty-ninth and Seventieth Congresses (March 4, 1925 – March 3, 1929).
He was an unsuccessful candidate for reelection in 1928 to the Seventy-first Congress.

Later career 
He served as special attorney in the Bureau of Internal Revenue 1929-1933.
He resumed the practice of law in Indianapolis, Indiana, and Washington, D.C., until March 2, 1942, when he was commissioned a captain in the United States Marine Corps Reserve.
He served overseas in the South Pacific with the First Marine Division, Fleet Marine Force, and was inactivated June 15, 1945.

He resumed the practice of law in Indianapolis, Indiana, and Washington, D.C., until his retirement.

Death 
He died in Arlington, Virginia, September 16, 1953.
He was interred in Arlington National Cemetery.

Was a Grandragon in the KKK in Indiana.

References

External links
 

1894 births
1953 deaths
United States Marine Corps officers
Burials at Arlington National Cemetery
Indiana University alumni
Republican Party members of the Indiana House of Representatives
Indiana state court judges
People from Brookville, Indiana
Columbia University alumni
Purdue University alumni
Politicians from Indianapolis
20th-century American judges
20th-century American politicians
Republican Party members of the United States House of Representatives from Indiana